Newton Downtown Historic District is a national historic district located at Newton, Catawba County, North Carolina.  The district encompasses 50 contributing buildings and 5 contributing objects in the central business district of Newton. Notable buildings include the First National Bank of Catawba County (c. 1923), H&W Drug Company (c. 1898, c. 1938), Belk-Brumley Department Store (c. 1920, c. 1940), Alman Furniture Company Building (c. 1950), Catawba County Courthouse (1924), Ervin Apartments (1936), Sanitary Grocery (c. 1905), Freeze Drug Store (c. 1906), Catawba County Library (1954), Haupt Building (c. 1955), City Hall and Fire Station (c. 1925), and Eagle Building (c. 1920).

It was listed on the National Register of Historic Places in 2012.

References

Historic districts on the National Register of Historic Places in North Carolina
Greek Revival architecture in North Carolina
Romanesque Revival architecture in North Carolina
Colonial Revival architecture in North Carolina
Buildings and structures in Catawba County, North Carolina
National Register of Historic Places in Catawba County, North Carolina